Dynda (also stylized as DynDa) was a Singaporean girl group formed in 2009. The group members are Setia Vegawati, Shenthy Feliziana Sudirman, Nurrenni Mohd Nor and Nur Rahila Redzuan. The group incorporates dance and hip-hop genres in their musical style. Dynda disbanded in 2014 due to an internal conflict within the group.

Career
Dynda was formed in December 2009 when Cat Farish, a member of Malaysian R&B group Ruffedge, discovered them while participating in Impak Maksima the Musical theatrical staging took place on The Esplanade, where they perform as backstage dancers. Working under Farish, the group launched their debut single "AMPM" composed by Cat, Adeep Nahar, Aiqa Halim and Francis Cobb in July 2010 under the label Alibi Music, followed by their next single, "Babe ... Hanya Kamu" in February 2011, to promote this single, Dynda has held a Babe ... Only You Dance Off competition to find dancers to appear in their music videos. Dynda went on to record and released further singles afterwards. After five singles released, they disbanded in 2014 due to an internal conflict within the group and now some of the ex-members have their own respective careers except for Setia, whose career has unfortunately gone downhill afterwards. One of the members, Shenty Feliziana has a successful career as an actress and television presenter.

Discography

EP
 AMPM (2014)

Singles
 "AMPM" (2010)
 "Babe… Hanya Kamu" (2011)
 "Sudah-Sudah (ft. Nawhki; 2012)
 "Bebaskan Hatimu" (ft. Ruzana Ibrahim; 2013)
 "Free Your Heart" (2013) 
 "Kerna Dirimu" (2014)

See also
 Dolla - similar K-pop-inspired girl group from Malaysia

References

External links
 DynDa on Facebook

Girl groups
Singaporean musical groups
21st-century Singaporean women singers
Singaporean dancers
Musical groups established in 2009
Musical groups disestablished in 2014